Burning in the Shade is the sixth studio album by the British heavy metal band  Tygers of Pan Tang, released in 1987.

Track listing
All songs by Jon Deverill, Steve Lamb, and Steve Thompson, except where indicated

Personnel
Band members
 Jon Deverill - lead and harmony vocals
 Steve Lamb - lead and rhythm guitars, backing vocals
 Brian Dick - drums, percussion

Additional musicians
 Steve Thompson: keyboards, bass, programming
 Phil Caffrey - backing vocals

Production
Gerry Barter - producer, engineer
Stuart Brown, Nigel Broad - assistant engineers

References

Tygers of Pan Tang albums
1987 albums
Cherry Red Records albums